The Crown is a Grade II listed public house at 116 Cloudesley Road, Islington, London.

It was built in the late 19th century.

References

Pubs in the London Borough of Islington
Grade II listed pubs in London
19th-century architecture in the United Kingdom
Buildings and structures completed in the 19th century
Grade II listed buildings in the London Borough of Islington
Buildings and structures in Islington